Thurn en Taxis (French: Tour et Taxis) is a railway station in Laeken in Brussels, Belgium, opened in 1883. The train station occupies the same site as the Line 6 metro station Pannenhuis. The station is located on the rue Charles Demeer.

History 
The station was opened on 1 May 1883 as "Pannenhuis" and later renamed to "Brussels North-West". The station closed down on 3 June 1984, but reopened in 2015 as part of the Brussels RER project under the name "Tour et Taxis".

Connections 
 Metro:  - Pannenhuis Station

Train services 
 Brussels RER services (S10) Dendermonde - Brussels - Denderleeuw - Aalst

Railway stations in Brussels
Railway stations opened in 1883
1883 establishments in Belgium